Escuchame may refer to:

"Escúchame", 1999 song by Carlos Ponce
Hard Working / Escúchame, 2000 EP by Braintax